The Rio Marquez Valley gecko (Phyllodactylus paucituberculatus) is a species of gecko. It is endemic to Mexico.

References

Phyllodactylus
Reptiles of Mexico
Reptiles described in 1960